{{Speciesbox
| image = Chrysopilus thoracicus.jpg
| genus = Chrysopilus
| species = thoracicus
| display_parents = 2
| authority = (Fabricius, 1805)
| synonyms = *Leptis thoracicus Fabricius, 1805
}}Chrysopilus thoracicus'', the golden-backed snipe fly, is a species of snipe flies in the family Rhagionidae.

  It is usually found in woodland areas of the eastern part of North America.

Distribustion
Canada, United States

References

Rhagionidae
Insects described in 1805
Diptera of North America
Taxa named by Johan Christian Fabricius